In the United States, a ward is an optional division of a city or town for administrative and representative purposes, especially for purposes of an election. Depending upon the state and local laws, the term ward can mean any of:
 an electoral district of a city council or town board, created for the purpose of providing more direct representation, from which one or more council members are elected; or
 a division used in political party leadership elections; or
 an administrative division, as in the wards of Newark, New Jersey or the six wards of Houston.

See also 
Ward (electoral subdivision)

References 

Municipal legislative districts of the United States
Local government in the United States